There are two state songs for New Mexico, as the state has two official languages:
The English-language "O Fair New Mexico"
The Spanish-language "Así Es Nuevo Méjico"